Hezhuang may refer to the following locations in China:

Towns
 Hezhuang, Xinzheng (和庄镇), in Xinzheng, Henan
 Hezhuang, Hangzhou (河庄镇), in Xiaoshan District, Hangzhou, Zhejiang

Townships
 Hezhuang Township, Wuqiao County (何庄乡), Hebei
 Hezhuang Township, Laiwu (和庄乡), in Laicheng District, Laiwu, Shandong